Christmas with the Poor or The Poor People's Christmas (Spanish:Navidad de los pobres) is a 1947 Argentine comedy film directed by Manuel Romero and starring Niní Marshall, Irma Córdoba and Tito Lusiardo.

Cast
 Niní Marshall 
 Irma Córdoba 
 Tito Lusiardo 
 Fernando Lamas 
 Osvaldo Miranda
 Orestes Soriani 
 Esperanza Palomero 
 Rosa Martín 
 Vicente Forastieri 
 Betty Lagos 
 Pepita Muñoz 
 Semillita 
 Hugo Lanzilotta
 Aída Villadeamigo as Lajefa

See also
 List of Christmas films

References

Bibliography 
 Paul A. Schroeder Rodríguez. Latin American Cinema: A Comparative History. Univ of California Press, 2016.

External links 
 

1947 films
1947 comedy films
1940s Spanish-language films
Films directed by Manuel Romero
1940s Christmas comedy films
Argentine Christmas comedy films
Argentine black-and-white films
1940s Argentine films